Bethamangala was one of the 224 constituencies in the Karnataka Legislative Assembly of Karnataka a south state of India. It was also part of Kolar Lok Sabha constituency.

Member of Legislative Assembly

Mysore State
 1951-1967: Seat did not exist
 1967: E. N. Gowda, Indian National Congress
 1972: K. M. Doreswamy Naidu, Independent

Karnataka State
 1978: C. Venkateshappa, Indian National Congress (Indira)
 1983: C. Venkateshappa, Indian National Congress
 1985: A. Chinnappa, Janata Party
 1989: M. Narayana Swamy, Janata Dal
 1994: M. Narayana Swamy, Janata Dal
 1999: C. Venkateshappa, Indian National Congress
 2004: B. P. Venkatamuniyappa, Bharatiya Janata Party
 2008 onwards: Seat does not exist

See also
 Kolar district
 List of constituencies of Karnataka Legislative Assembly

References

Former assembly constituencies of Karnataka
Kolar district